Palikulo Bay Airfield or Bomber Field #1 is a former World War II airfield on the island of Espiritu Santo in the New Hebrides Islands at the Espiritu Santo Naval Base.

History

World War II
The 7th Naval Construction Battalion arrived on Santo on 11 August 1942 and began construction of more extensive air facilities to support the Guadalcanal Campaign. After completing a second fighter airfield at Turtle Bay they began constructing a bomber field at Palikulo Bay. The 15th Naval Construction Battalion arrived on Santo on 13 October 1942 and added taxiways, revetments, and a  extension to the runway for air transport operation.

Units of the 5th Bombardment Group based at Palikulo included the 23d Bombardment Squadron operating B-17Es and later B-24s from 1 December 1942 until 3 January 1944, and the 72d Bombardment Squadron and 394th Bombardment Squadron both operating B-17s. On 13 August B-17E #41-2463 of the 394th Bombardment Squadron piloted by Gene Roddenberry crashed on takeoff due to mechanical failure.

Navy and USMC units based at Palikulo included:
VMD-154 operating PB4Ys
VMD-254 operating B-24s
VMO-250 operating J2Fs.

Following the sinking of the USS Wasp (CV-7) on 15 September 1942, VF-71 operating F4Fs was temporarily based at Palikulo.

On the nights of 15 and 23 October 1942 Palikulo was shelled by a Japanese submarine however no serious damage resulted.

Royal New Zealand Air Force (RNZAF) units based at Palikulo included:
No. 1 (Islands) Group Headquarters from 1 March 1943-January 1944
No. 3 Squadron operating Lockheed Hudsons from 9 October-6 December 1942 and later operating Lockheed Venturas in July 1944
No. 9 Squadron operating Lockheed Hudsons from March 1943
No. 14 Squadron operating P-40s from April–June 1943
No.25 Squadron operating SBDs from 30 January to 22 March 1944
The RNZAF operated a base depot at Palikulo that assembled aircraft that arrived aboard US ships and were then assigned to RNZAF Squadrons.

Postwar
NOB Espiritu Santo disestablished on 12 June 1946. Part of the airfield forms part of the main road along Palikulo Bay, while the remainder together with all taxiways and base facilities is largely overgrown with vegetation.

See also
Luganville Airfield
Luganville Seaplane Base
Santo-Pekoa International Airport
Turtle Bay Airfield

References

World War II airfields in the Pacific Ocean Theater
Airports in Vanuatu
Espiritu Santo
Airfields of the United States Navy
Military installations closed in the 1940s
1942 establishments in the New Hebrides
1945 disestablishments in Oceania
Closed installations of the United States Navy